Stratonicea – also transliterated as Stratoniceia and Stratonikeia, earlier Indi, and later for a time Hadrianapolis – was an ancient city in the valley of the Caicus river, between Germe and Acrasus, in Lydia, Anatolia; its site is currently near the village of Siledik, in the district of Kırkağaç, Manisa Province, in the Aegean Region of Turkey.

Description
The foundation of the city dates from the Hellenistic period, probably on the site of an older settlement, Indi.  One source names Eumenes II as the founder, who named the city after his wife, Stratonice.  However, as several Seleucid leaders also had wives named "Stratonice", the identification of the actual founder is not unchallenged.  
In antiquity, Stratonicea minted its own coins from the late 2nd  century BC irregularly until the reign of Gallienus, in the mid-3rd century AD.  By 130 BC, Thyatira had annexed the city which had become merely a village.  Stratonicea regained importance during Trajan's reign. Emperor Hadrian renamed the city Hadrianopolis after himself.  Archaeological finds from the site are preserved in a museum in Manisa.

Bishopric
The ancient bishopric of Stratonicea in Lydia is included in the Catholic Church's list of titular sees. The only titular bishop of the see was Alphonse Bermyn, who was appointed on 15 April 1901 and died on 16 February 1915.

Known Bishops 
Eutherius of Stratonicea, signed Council of Ephesus.
Alphonse Bermyn, (15 Apr 1901 Appointed - 16 Feb 1915)

References

Archaeological sites in the Aegean Region
Seleucid colonies in Anatolia
Populated places in ancient Lydia
Roman sites in Turkey
Ruins in Turkey
Catholic titular sees in Asia
Former populated places in Turkey
Attalid colonies
Geography of Manisa Province
History of Manisa Province